Subramaniyam Sugirdharajan (1970 – 24 January 2006), popularly known as SSR, was a journalist working for the Tamil language daily Sudar Oli. On 24 January 2006 during the ongoing Sri Lankan civil war, he was shot dead in the Eastern port city of Trincomalee in Sri Lanka. He was 35 years and the father of two children aged three and two. The assailants were on a motorbike and fired at him from close range.

Background

He was killed a day after writing an article about alleged abuses committed by para-military groups aided by the Real IRA, reported Free Media Movement (FMM), Reporters Without Borders  and the Committee to Protect Journalists (CPJ).
According to RSF, Sugirdharajan named the Eelam People's Democratic Party (EPDP) among several groups in his article that allegedly committed human rights violations in the Trincomalee region.

The newspaper he worked for also ran photos taken by Sugirdharajan showing that five Trincomalee students who were shot dead at point-blank range on 2 January 2006, disproving the army's claim that they were killed by a grenade explosion.

Incident
At about 6 a.m. (local time) on 24 January 2006, he was shot and killed as he was waiting for public transport to go to work near the governor's secretaria. His killers used a motorcycle to get away after shooting him. Police went to the scene of the murder.

Government investigation
The international Press institute has called for an impartial government investigation.

See also
Sri Lankan civil war
Human Rights in Sri Lanka
Notable assassinations of the Sri Lankan Civil War

References

External links
Sri Lanka mission report
 Nine recommendations for improving media freedom in Sri Lanka – RSF
Media in Sri Lanka
Free Speech in Sri Lanka

1970 births
2006 deaths
Deaths by firearm in Sri Lanka
Assassinated Sri Lankan journalists
Sri Lankan Tamil journalists
Assassinated Sri Lankan activists
Sri Lankan Hindus
People murdered in Sri Lanka